Arnaud Dulac is a French rugby league footballer who represented France in the 2000 World Cup.

Playing career
Dulac played for the Saint-Gaudens Bears and played twenty three test matches for France between 1995 and 2004. He played in the 1997 Super League World Nines, on the 2001 tour of New Zealand and Papua New Guinea and in all four matches at the 2000 World Cup.

References

1971 births
Living people
France national rugby league team captains
France national rugby league team players
French rugby league players
Rugby league five-eighths
Rugby league centres
Saint-Gaudens Bears players